Brickeys is an unincorporated community in Lee County, Arkansas, United States. Brickeys has a post office with ZIP code 72320.

Education
It is in the Lee County School District, based in Marianna. The local high school is Lee High School.

In 1967 the Aubrey, Brickeys, and Moro school districts all merged into the Marianna district.

References

Unincorporated communities in Lee County, Arkansas
Unincorporated communities in Arkansas